Ayr is a city in Cass County, North Dakota, United States. The population was 11 at the 2020 census. Ayr was founded in 1883.

Geography

Demographics

2010 census
As of the census of 2010, there were 17 people, 9 households, and 4 families living in the city. The racial makeup of the city was 100.0% White.

There were 9 households, of which 11.1% had children under the age of 18 living with them, 44.4% were married couples living together, and 55.6% were non-families. 55.6% of all households were made up of individuals, and 22.2% had someone living alone who was 65 years of age or older. The average household size was 1.89 and the average family size was 3.00.

The median age in the city was 56.3 years. 23.5% of residents were under the age of 18; 0.1% were between the ages of 18 and 24; 17.7% were from 25 to 44; 23.6% were from 45 to 64; and 35.3% were 65 years of age or older. The gender makeup of the city was 41.2% male and 58.8% female.

2000 census
As of the census of 2000, there were 23 people, 11 households, and 7 families living in the city. The population density was 279.5 people per square mile (111.0/km2). There were 13 housing units at an average density of 158.0 per square mile (62.7/km2). The racial makeup of the city was 86.96% White, and 13.04% from two or more races.

There were 11 households, out of which 9.1% had children under the age of 18 living with them, 63.6% were married couples living together, and 27.3% were non-families. 27.3% of all households were made up of individuals, and 18.2% had someone living alone who was 65 years of age or older. The average household size was 2.09 and the average family size was 2.38.

In the city, the population was spread out, with 13.0% under the age of 18, 4.3% from 18 to 24, 21.7% from 25 to 44, 17.4% from 45 to 64, and 43.5% who were 65 years of age or older. The median age was 50 years. For every 100 females, there were 76.9 males. For every 100 females age 18 and over, there were 100.0 males.

The median income for a household in the city was $46,875, and the median income for a family was $139,068. Males had a median income of $33,750 versus $0 for females. The per capita income for the city was $55,567. None of the population and none of the families were below the poverty line.

References

Cities in Cass County, North Dakota
Cities in North Dakota
Populated places established in 1883
1883 establishments in Dakota Territory